Cirroc Lofton (born August 7, 1978) is an American actor and podcaster who started his career at nine years of age with many minor roles. He got his start in the 1989 child education program Econ and Me, which teaches kids economics. He is best known for playing Jake Sisko on the 1990s TV series Star Trek: Deep Space Nine.

Early life
Lofton was born in Los Angeles, California. He is the nephew of the former Major League Baseball center fielder Kenny Lofton.

Career
Lofton's first major role on a TV series was also his longest role, playing Jake Sisko, the son of the lead character, Benjamin Sisko on the science fiction TV series Star Trek: Deep Space Nine from 1993 to 1999.

In September 2003 he played Maynard, a preacher's son who went to Harvard in the 7th Heaven episode "PK".

He also had a regular role as professional basketball player Curtis Thorpe on the Showtime drama series The Hoop Life, and a recurring role as law student Anthony Carter on the Showtime drama series Soul Food.

Lofton portrayed Tommy Boyer in "Darkroom", a 2006 episode of the CBS television series CSI: Miami.

References

External links

 

1978 births
20th-century American actors
20th-century American male actors
African-American male actors
American male child actors
American male television actors
American podcasters
Living people
Male actors from Los Angeles
20th-century African-American people
21st-century African-American people